Pseudexomilus fuscoapicatus is a species of sea snail, a marine gastropod mollusk in the family Horaiclavidae, the turrids.

Description
The length of the shell attains 16 mm.

Distribution
This marine species occurs in the Indian Ocean off Somalia.

References

External links
  Tucker, J.K. 2004 Catalog of recent and fossil turrids (Mollusca: Gastropoda). Zootaxa 682:1–1295.

Endemic fauna of Somalia
fuscoapicatus
Gastropods described in 1997